Aquiles Córdova Morán (born 1941) is a Mexican political leader. Since 1974, when he founded the organization, he has been the secretary general of the National Torch Movement (Antorcha Campesina). a social organization created by a group of peasants. He was born in Tecomatlán, Puebla and is an agronomist by profession, graduated from the Chapingo Autonomous University.

References

Mexican activists
Agronomists
Living people
1941 births
People from Puebla
Chapingo Autonomous University alumni